Peter Byrne (born 29 January 1948) is an Australian basketball player. He competed in the men's tournament at the 1972 Summer Olympics.

References

1948 births
Living people
Australian men's basketball players
Basketball players at the 1972 Summer Olympics
Basketball players from Melbourne
Olympic basketball players of Australia
Sportsmen from Victoria (Australia)